Thierry Peponnet (born 7 September 1959) is a French sailor and Olympic champion.

He won a gold medal in the 470 Class at the 1988 Summer Olympics in Seoul, together with Luc Pillot. They received bronze medals in 1984.

He was involved with Le Défi in the 1995 Louis Vuitton Cup and 2000 Louis Vuitton Cup, and Areva Challenge at the 2007 Louis Vuitton Cup.

References

External links
 
 
 
 

1959 births
Living people
French male sailors (sport)
Olympic sailors of France
Olympic gold medalists for France
Olympic bronze medalists for France
Olympic medalists in sailing
Sailors at the 1984 Summer Olympics – 470
Sailors at the 1988 Summer Olympics – 470
Medalists at the 1984 Summer Olympics
Medalists at the 1988 Summer Olympics
2007 America's Cup sailors
2000 America's Cup sailors
1995 America's Cup sailors
470 class world champions
World champions in sailing for France